Diawara is a town and commune in Tambacounda Region of eastern Senegal, lying in the Senegal river valley near the Malian border. Its population in 2013 was about 17,500. 

Diawara is twinned with the French commune of Longvic on the Côte d'Or.

See also 
 Railway stations in Senegal

References 

Populated places in Tambacounda Region
Communes of Senegal